Diego Morandeira (born 4 February 1993) is an Uruguayan handball player for Ikasa Madrid and the Uruguay national team.

He represented Uruguay at the 2021 World Men's Handball Championship.

Achievements
2017 Four Nations Tournament: Top scorer

References

1993 births
Living people
Uruguayan male handball players
Expatriate handball players
Uruguayan expatriate sportspeople in Spain
South American Games bronze medalists for Uruguay
South American Games medalists in handball
Competitors at the 2022 South American Games